Wescley Pina Gonçalves (born February 15, 1984) is a Brazilian footballer currently playing for Vila Nova Futebol Clube.

Career

Vasco da Gama

Wescley started his career playing for Vasco da Gama, after being promoted from the club's youth squad. Earlier in the 2003 Campeonato Brasileiro Série A season, he was promoted to the club's first team squad, playing several games for the club and scoring a goal in the second match of the competition, against Goiás.

Stint in Israel
Before arriving in Israel, a lot of media attention was paid to Wescley since he was signing with Maccabi Haifa and was expected to be their leader for the future. Wescley had the credentials especially since he was captain of the Brazilian Olympic team but was unable to acclimate to Israeli culture and ended leaving after a mediocre first season.

Return to Brazil
He returned to Brazil in 2005, to play for Corinthians, where he won the Campeonato Brasileiro Série A of that year, playing for Estrela da Amadora of Portugal in the following year. Wescley played for Juventude during the Série A 2007, but was unable to prevent his club from being relegated to the second level. In 2008, he joined Criciúma.

First time in Turkey
On 22 December 2008, Denizlispor announced that Wescley joins the team.

References

External links
  Profile at the Brazilian Football Confederation official website
  Profile of Wescley on Maccabi Haifa's official website
Profile at TFF

1984 births
Living people
Brazilian footballers
Brazilian expatriate footballers
CR Vasco da Gama players
Maccabi Haifa F.C. players
Sport Club Corinthians Paulista players
C.F. Estrela da Amadora players
Clube Náutico Capibaribe players
Esporte Clube Juventude players
Criciúma Esporte Clube players
Grêmio Barueri Futebol players
Associação Atlética Ponte Preta players
Vila Nova Futebol Clube players
Denizlispor footballers
Süper Lig players
Expatriate footballers in Israel
Expatriate footballers in Portugal
Expatriate footballers in Turkey
Brazilian expatriate sportspeople in Turkey
Association football central defenders